
Gmina Jaworze is a rural gmina (administrative district) in Bielsko County, Silesian Voivodeship, in southern Poland.

Villages
The gmina is divided into four settlements: Jaworze Średnie (Middle Jaworze), Jaworze Górne (Upper Jaworze), Jaworze Dolne (Lower Jaworze) and Jaworze Nałęże.

Neighbouring gminas
Gmina Jaworze is bordered by the city of Bielsko-Biała and by the gminas of Brenna and Jasienica.

References

External links
  Official website of the gmina

Jaworze
Bielsko County
Cieszyn Silesia